Major-General Lord Charles Manners (died 5 December 1761) was a British soldier, the ninth and youngest son of John Manners, 2nd Duke of Rutland.

Military career
He served as an officer in the 3rd Foot Guards. He was appointed a captain in the regiment on 4 June 1745. He was issued a warrant to raise and organise a regiment of infantry in December 1755, and appointed to its colonelcy shortly before the end of the year. This was the 58th Regiment of Foot, shortly thereafter renumbered the 56th Regiment of Foot.

He was appointed major-general on 15 September 1759, and died in 1761.

References
Notes

Sources
 Digitised copy

British Army generals
Scots Guards officers
Younger sons of dukes
1761 deaths
Charles
Sherard family
56th Regiment of Foot officers
Year of birth unknown
18th-century British Army personnel